The Hawaiian Islands are an archipelago of eight major islands, several atolls, and numerous smaller islets in the North Pacific Ocean, extending some  from the island of Hawaii in the south to northernmost Kure Atoll. Formerly the group was known to Europeans and Americans as the Sandwich Islands, a name that James Cook chose in honor of the 4th Earl of Sandwich, the then First Lord of the Admiralty. Cook came across the islands by chance when crossing the Pacific Ocean on his Third Voyage in 1778, on board HMS Resolution; he was later killed on the islands on a return visit. The contemporary name of the islands, dating from the 1840s, is derived from the name of the largest island, Hawaii Island.

Hawaii sits on the Pacific Plate and is the only U.S. state that is not geographically connected to North America. It is part of the Polynesia subregion of Oceania. The state of Hawaii occupies the archipelago almost in its entirety (including the mostly uninhabited Northwestern Hawaiian Islands), with the sole exception of Midway Atoll, which also belongs to the United States, as one of its unincorporated territories within the United States Minor Outlying Islands.

Hawaii is the exposed peaks of a great undersea mountain range known as the Hawaiian–Emperor seamount chain, formed by volcanic activity over a hotspot in the Earth's mantle.

Islands and reefs

The date of the first settlements of the Hawaiian Islands is a topic of continuing debate. Archaeological evidence seems to indicate a settlement as early as 124 AD.

Captain James Cook, RN, visited the islands on January 18, 1778, and named them the "Sandwich Islands" in honor of The 4th Earl of Sandwich, who as the First Lord of the Admiralty was one of his sponsors. This name was in use until the 1840s, when the local name "Hawaii" gradually began to take precedence.

Except for Midway, which is an unincorporated territory of the United States, these islands and islets are administered as Hawaii—the 50th state of the United States.

Major islands

The eight major islands of Hawaii (Windward Islands) are listed above. All except Kaho'olawe are inhabited.

Minor islands, islets

The state of Hawaii counts 137 "islands" in the Hawaiian chain. This number includes all minor islands (small islands), islets (even smaller islands) offshore of the major islands (listed above) and individual islets in each atoll. These are just a few:
 Kaʻula
 Kāohikaipu
 Lehua
 Mānana
 Mōkōlea Rock
 Mokolii
 Moku Manu
 Mokuauia
 Moku o Loʻe
 Moku Ola
 Mokuʻumeʻume
 Molokini
 Nā Mokulua

Partial islands, atolls, reefs

Partial islands, atolls, reefs (west of Niihau are uninhabited except Midway Atoll) form the Northwestern Hawaiian Islands (Leeward Islands):
 Nihoa (Mokumana)
 Necker (Mokumanamana)
 French Frigate Shoals (Kānemilohai)
 Gardner Pinnacles (Pūhāhonu)
 Maro Reef (Nalukākala)
 Laysan (Kauō)
 Lisianski Island (Papaāpoho)
 Pearl and Hermes Atoll (Holoikauaua)
 Midway Atoll (Pihemanu)
 Kure Atoll (Mokupāpapa)

Geology

Thus, the southeast island is volcanically active, whereas the islands on the northwest end of the archipelago are older and typically smaller, due to longer exposure to erosion. The age of the archipelago has been estimated using potassium-argon dating methods. From this study and others, it is estimated that the northwesternmost island, Kure Atoll, is the oldest at approximately 28 million years (Ma); while the southeasternmost island, Hawaii, is approximately 0.4 Ma (400,000 years). The only active volcanism in the last 200 years has been on the southeastern island, Hawaii, and on the submerged but growing volcano to the extreme southeast, Kamaʻehuakanaloa (formerly Loihi). The Hawaiian Volcano Observatory of the USGS  documents recent volcanic activity and provides images and interpretations of the volcanism. Kīlauea had been erupting nearly continuously since 1983 when it stopped August 2018.

Almost all of the magma of the hotspot has the composition of basalt, and so the Hawaiian volcanoes are composed almost entirely of this igneous rock. There is very little coarser-grained gabbro and diabase. Nephelinite is exposed on the islands but is extremely rare. The majority of eruptions in Hawaii are Hawaiian-type eruptions because basaltic magma is relatively fluid compared with magmas typically involved in more explosive eruptions, such as the andesitic magmas that produce some of the spectacular and dangerous eruptions around the margins of the Pacific basin.

Hawaii island (the Big Island) is the biggest and youngest island in the chain, built from five volcanoes. Mauna Loa, taking up over half of the Big Island, is the largest shield volcano on the Earth.

Earthquakes

The Hawaiian Islands have many earthquakes, generally caused by volcanic activity. Most of the early earthquake monitoring took place in Hilo, by missionaries Titus Coan, Sarah J. Lyman and her family. Between 1833 and 1896, approximately 4 or 5 earthquakes were reported per year.

Hawaii accounted for 7.3% of the United States' reported earthquakes with a magnitude 3.5 or greater from 1974 to 2003, with a total 1533 earthquakes. Hawaii ranked as the state with the third most earthquakes over this time period, after Alaska and California.

On October 15, 2006, there was an earthquake with a magnitude of 6.7 off the northwest coast of the island of Hawaii, near the Kona area of the big island. The initial earthquake was followed approximately five minutes later by a magnitude 5.7 aftershock. Minor-to-moderate damage was reported on most of the Big Island. Power outages lasted for several hours to days. Several water mains ruptured. No deaths or life-threatening injuries were reported.

On May 4, 2018, there was a 6.9 earthquake in the zone of volcanic activity from Kīlauea.

Earthquakes are monitored by the Hawaiian Volcano Observatory run by the USGS.

Tsunamis

The Hawaiian Islands are subject to tsunamis, great waves that strike the shore. Tsunamis are most often caused by earthquakes somewhere in the Pacific.

Tsunamis may also originate from the Hawaiian Islands. Explosive volcanic activity can cause tsunamis. The island of Molokai had a catastrophic collapse or debris avalanche over a million years ago; this underwater landslide likely caused tsunamis. The Hilina Slump on the island of Hawaii is another potential place for a large landslide and resulting tsunami.

The city of Hilo on the Big Island has been most affected by tsunamis, where the in-rushing water is accentuated by the shape of Hilo Bay. Coastal cities have tsunami warning sirens.

A tsunami resulting from an earthquake in Chile hit the islands on February 27, 2010. It was relatively minor, but local emergency management officials utilized the latest technology and ordered evacuations in preparation for a possible major event. The Governor declared it a "good drill" for the next major event.

A tsunami resulting from an earthquake in Japan hit the islands on March 11, 2011. It was relatively minor, but local officials ordered evacuations in preparation for a possible major event. The tsunami caused about $30.1 million in damages.

History

Ecology

The islands are home to a multitude of endemic species. Since human settlement, first by Polynesians, non native trees, plants, and animals were introduced. These included species such as rats and pigs, that have preyed on native birds and invertebrates that initially evolved in the absence of such predators. The growing population of humans has also led to deforestation, forest degradation, treeless grasslands, and environmental degradation. As a result, many species which depended on forest habitats and food became extinct—with many current species facing extinction. As humans cleared land for farming, monocultural crop production replaced multi-species systems.

The arrival of the Europeans had a more significant impact, with the promotion of large-scale single-species export agriculture and livestock grazing. This led to increased clearing of forests, and the development of towns, adding many more species to the list of extinct animals of the Hawaiian Islands. , many of the remaining endemic species are considered endangered.

National Monument
On June 15, 2006, President George W. Bush issued a public proclamation creating Papahānaumokuākea Marine National Monument under the Antiquities Act of 1906. The Monument encompasses the northwestern Hawaiian Islands and surrounding waters, forming the largest marine wildlife reserve in the world. In August 2010, UNESCO's World Heritage Committee added Papahānaumokuākea to its list of World Heritage Sites. On August 26, 2016, President Barack Obama greatly expanded Papahānaumokuākea, quadrupling it from its original size.

Climate

The Hawaiian Islands are tropical but experience many different climates, depending on altitude and surroundings.  The islands receive most rainfall from the trade winds on their north and east flanks (the windward side) as a result of orographic precipitation. Coastal areas in general and especially the south and west flanks, or leeward sides, tend to be drier.

In general, the lowlands of Hawaiian Islands receive most of their precipitation during the winter months (October to April). Drier conditions generally prevail from May to September. The tropical storms, and occasional hurricanes, tend to occur from July through November.

During the summer months the average temperature is about 84 °F (29 °C), in the winter months it is approximately 79 °F (26 °C). As the temperature is relatively constant over the year the probability of dangerous thunderstorms is approximately low.

See also

 Hawaii Inter-Island Cable System
 Index of Hawaii-related articles
 List of birds of Hawaii
 List of fish of Hawaii
 List of mountain peaks of Hawaii
 List of Ultras of Hawaii
 Maritime fur trade
 Outline of Hawaii

References

Further reading
 
 An integrated information website focused on the Hawaiian Archipelago from the Pacific Region Integrated Data Enterprise (PRIDE).

1970 edition:  
 The Ocean Atlas of Hawai‘i  – SOEST at University of Hawaii.
  Volcano World ; Your World is Erupting – Oregon State University College of Science

 
Archipelagoes of the Pacific Ocean
Archipelagoes of Oceania
Archipelagoes of the United States
Divided regions
Geography of Polynesia
Islands
Hudson's Bay Company trading posts
Physical oceanography
Eastern Indo-Pacific
Marine ecoregions